Media Player, designated as Windows Media Player in the Microsoft Store, is a video and audio player developed by Microsoft for Windows 11 and subsequently backported to Windows 10. It is the successor to Groove Music (previously Xbox Music), Microsoft Movies & TV and Windows Media Player.  It was offered to all Windows 11 users starting on February 15, 2022, with Windows 10 users following in January 2023.

The new Media Player can also play video, as part of Groove's rebranding from a music streaming service to a media player. Other changes include the album cover view being in fullscreen, and a refresh to the mini player. Accessibility has also been optimized, with some improved keyboard shortcuts and hotkey support for keyboard users and with other assistive technologies.

Supported formats
This is a list of known supported formats in Media Player on Windows 11.

See also
Groove Music – UWP-based music player; predecessor of Media Player for Windows 11
Microsoft Movies & TV – UWP-based video player and online store
Windows Media Player – Win32-based "classic" media player app

References 

Windows 11
Microsoft Windows multimedia technology
Windows media players
Microsoft software
2022 software